Alexandre De Saedeleer (14 November 1987, Etterbeek) is a Belgian international field hockey player.  At the 2012 Summer Olympics, he competed for the national team in the men's tournament. De Saedeleer won the silver medal with Belgium at the 2013 European Championship on home ground in Boom.

References

External links
 

Living people
Belgian male field hockey players
Field hockey players at the 2012 Summer Olympics
Olympic field hockey players of Belgium
1987 births
People from Etterbeek
Field hockey players from Brussels
2014 Men's Hockey World Cup players